KAWE (channel 9) is a PBS member television station in Bemidji, Minnesota, United States, owned by Northern Minnesota Public Television, Inc. The station's studios are located on Grant Avenue Northeast in Bemidji, and its transmitter is located southeast of Blackduck, Minnesota.

KAWB (channel 22) in Brainerd operates as a full-time satellite of KAWE; this station's transmitter is located near East Gull Lake, Minnesota. KAWB covers areas of central Minnesota that receive a marginal to non-existent over-the-air signal from KAWE, although there is significant overlap between the two stations' contours otherwise. KAWB is a straight simulcast of KAWE; on-air references to KAWB are limited to Federal Communications Commission (FCC)-mandated hourly station identifications during programming.

The two stations are collectively branded as Lakeland PBS. The network first took to the air on June 1, 1980, and was formerly known as Lakeland Public Television; it re-branded on January 8, 2018, to better align its brand with PBS. It is the only full-power television broadcasting operation based in north central Minnesota, an area that is served mainly by translators of the Minneapolis–Saint Paul television stations.

Lakeland PBS utilizes KAWB's channel 22 position on DirecTV and Dish Network's Twin Cities local lineups to avert confusion with Fox owned-and-operated station KMSP-TV (channel 9) in Minneapolis.

Newscasts
Lakeland PBS produces a 30-minute local newscast Monday through Friday. The newscast originates from its studios in Bemidji, and the station also has a news-production facility in Brainerd. Lakeland PBS airs the only local newscast in north central Minnesota.

Technical information

Subchannels
Lakeland PBS' television signals are multiplexed into six subchannels.

Translators
The broadcast areas of KAWE and KAWB are extended by way of seven digital translators in northern Minnesota and one in central Minnesota.

References

External links

PBS member stations
Television channels and stations established in 1980
1980 establishments in Minnesota
Television stations in Minnesota
Brainerd, Minnesota
First Nations Experience affiliates